F.P. Nelson House, also known as The Towers, is a historic home located at Greencastle, Putnam County, Indiana. It was built between 1871 and 1875, and is a large two-story, Italianate style brick dwelling.  It has a  low hipped roof and sits on a stone foundation. The house features segmental arched openings, a projecting entrance bay, and two-story polygonal bay.

It was listed on the National Register of Historic Places in 1983.  It is located in the Eastern Enlargement Historic District.

References

Houses on the National Register of Historic Places in Indiana
Italianate architecture in Indiana
Houses completed in 1875
Buildings and structures in Putnam County, Indiana
National Register of Historic Places in Putnam County, Indiana
Historic district contributing properties in Indiana